Alberto Egea (29 August 1901 – 13 December 1958) was a Venezuelan artist. His work was part of the art competition at the 1932 Summer Olympics.

References

1901 births
1958 deaths
Venezuelan artists
Olympic competitors in art competitions
People from Caracas